Sapa or Sapë may refer to:

Places
 Sapa, Mississippi, a community in the United States
 Sa Pa (town), Lao Cai, Vietnam
 Sapë, a town in Albania
 Roman Catholic Diocese of Sapë, one of six such diocese of Albania
 Namayan or Sapa, a former barangay state in the Philippines
 Sapa, Çorum

Acronyms
 South African Press Association
 Synthetic Aperture Personality Assessment

Other uses
 Sapa (sweetener), a reduction of must
 SAPA (football club), Helsinki, Finland
 Sapa (Prague), a Vietnamese market
 Sapa Arena, Vetlanda, Sweden
 Sapa Group, a Norwegian-based aluminium company
 Sapa Inca, the title of the hereditary ruler of the Inca
 Sapa language, a Southwestern Tai language of Sa Pa, Lào Cai Province, northern Vietnam

See also
 Paha Sapa, the Black Hills, U.S.
 Sapa-Sapa, Tawi-Tawi, Philippines
 Sape (disambiguation)
 Sappa (disambiguation)